The Gomphidae are a family of dragonflies commonly referred to as clubtails or club-tailed dragonflies. The family contains about 90 genera and 900 species found across North and South America, Europe, Asia, and Australia. The name refers to the club-like widening of the end of the abdomen (abdominal segments 7 through 9). However, this club is usually less pronounced in females and is entirely absent in some species.

Etymology
The name may be derived from Latin gomphus or gond meaning "hinge".

Characteristics
Clubtails have small, widely separated compound eyes, a trait they share with the Petaluridae and with damselflies. The eyes are blue, turquoise, or green. The thorax in most species is pale with dark stripes, and the pattern of the stripes is often diagnostic. They lack the bright metallic colors of many dragonfly groups and are mostly cryptically colored to avoid detection and little difference between the sexes is seen.

Clubtails are fast-flying dragonflies with short flight seasons. They spend much time at rest, perching in a suitable position to dart forth to prey on flying insects. They tend to perch on the ground or on leaves with the abdomen sloping up and its tip curling down a little. Larger species may perch with a drooping abdomen or lie flat on a leaf. Another stance adopted by clubtails perching in the open is "obelisking", standing with the abdomen raised vertically, a posture adopted otherwise only by the skimmers.

Most clubtails breed in streams, rivers, or lakes. The nymphs are unusual in having a flat mentum, part of the mouthparts, and their antennae have only four segments. They burrow in the sediment at the bottom of the water body, with the nymphs of the dragonhunter (Hagenius brevistylus) living among damp bark and leaf litter at the edge of the water. Some larvae variations actually differ from this typical burrowing.  Some will only come out during daytime, which differs from the predominant nighttime emergence.  Some larvae also will lay on flat surfaces, whereas most larvae prefer a vertical-type surface.

Gallery

Genera
These genera belong to the family Gomphidae.

 Acrogomphus Laidlaw, 1925
 Agriogomphus Selys, 1869
 Amphigomphus Chao, 1954
 Anisogomphus Selys, 1858
 Anomalophlebia Belle, 1995
 Anormogomphus Selys, 1854
 Antipodogomphus Fraser, 1951
 Aphylla Selys, 1854
 Archaeogomphus Williamson, 1919
 Arigomphus Needham, 1897
 Armagomphus Carle, 1986
 Asiagomphus Asahina, 1985
 Austrogomphus Selys, 1854
 Brasiliogomphus Belle, 1995
 Burmagomphus Williamson, 1907
 Cacoides Cowley, 1934
 Ceratogomphus Selys, 1854
 Cinitogomphus Pinhey, 1964
 Cornigomphus Martin, 1907
 Crenigomphus Selys, 1892
 Cyanogomphus Selys, 1873
 Cyclogomphus Selys, 1854
 Davidioides Fraser, 1924
 Davidius Selys, 1878
 Desmogomphus Williamson, 1920
 Diaphlebia Selys, 1854
 Diastatomma Burmeister, 1839
 Dromogomphus Selys, 1854
 Dubitogomphus Fraser, 1940
 Ebegomphus Needham, 1944
 Eogomphus Needham, 1941
 Epigomphus Hagen in Selys, 1854
 Erpetogomphus Selys, 1858
 Euthygomphus Kosterin, 2016
 Fukienogomphus Chao, 1954
 Gastrogomphus Needham, 1941
 Gomphidia Selys, 1854
 Gomphidictinus Fraser, 1942
 Gomphoides Selys, 1854
 Gomphurus Needham, 1901
 Gomphus Leach in Brewester, 1815
 Hagenius Selys, 1854
 Heliogomphus Laidlaw, 1922
 Hemigomphus Selys, 1854
 Hylogomphus Needham, Westfall & May, 2000
 Ictinogomphus Cowley, 1934
 Idiogomphoides Belle, 1984
 Isomma Selys, 1892
 Labrogomphus Needham, 1931
 Lamelligomphus Fraser, 1922
 Lanthus Needham, 1897
 Leptogomphus Selys, 1878
 Lestinogomphus Martin, 1911
 Lindenia de Haan, 1826
 Macrogomphus Selys, 1858
 Malgassogomphus Cammaerts, 1987
 Mastigogomphus Cammaerts, 2004
 Megalogomphus Campion, 1923
 Melanocacus Belle, 1986
 Melligomphus Chao, 1990
 Merogomphus Martin, 1904
 Microgomphus Selys, 1858
 Mitragomphus Needham, 1944
 Neogomphus Selys, 1858
 Nepogomphoides Fraser, 1934
 Nepogomphus Fraser, 1934
 Neurogomphus Karsch, 1890
 Nihonogomphus Oguma, 1926
 Notogomphus Selys, 1858
 Nychogomphus Carle, 1986
 Octogomphus Selys, 1873
 Odontogomphus Watson, 1991
 Onychogomphus Selys, 1854
 Ophiogomphus Selys, 1854
 Orientogomphus Chao & Xu, 1987
 Paragomphus Cowley, 1934
 Perigomphus Belle, 1972
 Perissogomphus Laidlaw, 1922
 Peruviogomphus Klots, 1944
 Phaenandrogomphus Lieftinck, 1964
 Phanogomphus Carle, 1986
 Phyllocycla Calvert, 1948
 Phyllogomphoides Belle, 1970
 Phyllogomphus Selys, 1854
 Platygomphus Selys, 1854
 Praeviogomphus Belle, 1995
 Progomphus Selys, 1854
 Scalmogomphus Chao, 1990
 Shaogomphus Chao, 1984
 Sieboldius Selys, 1854
 Sinictinogomphus Fraser, 1939
 Sinogomphus May, 1935
 Stenogomphurus Carle, 1986
 Stylogomphus Fraser, 1922
 Stylurus Needham, 1897
 Tibiagomphus Belle, 1992
 Tragogomphus Sjöstedt, 1899
 Trigomphus Bartenev, 1911
 Zonophora Selys, 1854

Fossil genera 

 †Auroradraco Archibald and Cannings 2019 Kamloops Group, Canada, Ypresian
 †Gunterbechya Huang et al 2019 Burmese amber, Cenomanian
 †Nannogomphus Handlirsch 1906

References

External links

Commonwealth Scientific and Industrial Research Organisation (CSIRO)
More information about clubtail dragonflies
Gomphidae, CLUBTAILS, Discover Life

 
Aeshnoidea
Odonata families
Taxa named by Jules Pierre Rambur